Luokan is a town of Zhenxiong County in northeastern Yunnan province, China, located  northwest of the county seat and  northeast of Zhaotong as the crow flies. , it had 17 villages under its administration.

References 

Township-level divisions of Zhaotong